The 2012 Oceania Athletics Championships were held at the Barlow Park in Cairns, Australia, between June 27–29, 2012.

Medals are awarded in the two regional divisions "East" and "West".

A total of 40 events were contested, 20 by men and 20 by women.  Moreover, a mixed 8x100 metres relay, as well as exhibition events for local athletes with disabilities, masters athletes and school age athletes were included.

Athletics Northern Territory and Athletics North Queensland sent a Combined "North Australia" Team including athletes who have not been chosen in the official Australian Team.  The status of these athletes (e.g., eligibility for winning medals or guest status) could not be determined.  However, one source verifies the win of a medal for an athlete representing Northern Australia.

Complete results can be found on the webpages of Oceania Athletics Association and of Queensland Athletics.

Regional Division East

Medal summary

Men

Women

Medal Table East (unofficial)

Participation East (unofficial)
The participation of athletes from 10 countries could be determined. Tuvalu sent only athletes for the U-20 championships.
East regional division:

Regional Division West

Medal summary

Men

2.): The 4 x 100 metres relay event was won by  "B" (Anthony Alozie, Isaac Ntiamoah, Andrew McCabe, Josh Ross) in 39.45 running as guests.
"B" (Jordan Gusman, Harris Scouller, Nathan McConchie, Vaughn Harber) came in 4th in 3:24.69 also running a guests.

Women

Medal Table West (unofficial)

Participation West (unofficial)
The participation of athletes from 10 countries could be determined.  In addition, a combined Northern Australia team including athletes from the Northern Territory and North Queensland participated.  There were no athletes from Palau.

/ North Australia

References

External links
Oceania Athletics - Results

Oceania Athletics Championships
International athletics competitions hosted by Australia
Oceanian Championships
2012 in Australian sport
June 2012 sports events in Australia